Jacob Thorssell (born 24 July 1993 in Åtvidaberg, Sweden) is a motorcycle speedway rider from Sweden. He is a two times Swedish national champion.

Career
Thorssell joined Wolverhampton Wolves in the Elite League for the 2012 season, as a replacement for Pontus Aspgren who had picked up an injury. After impressing at Wolves, Thorssell was announced in the permanent line-up for the 2013 season. 

After continuing to impress in 2013 and also in 2014 Thorssell made the step up to being one of Wolverhampton's three heat leaders for the 2015 season, and was the first rider to be announced in their team. 

He remained at Wolves for eight seasons until the end of the 2019 season. From 2021 to 2022 he rode for Opole in the Polish leagues and since 2019 has ridden for Dackarna in his home country. Thorssell was Swedish national champion after winning the Swedish Individual Speedway Championship in both 2019 and 2020.

References

Swedish motorcycle racers
1993 births
Living people
Wolverhampton Wolves riders
Swedish speedway riders